Associazione Sportiva Dilettantistica MapelloBonate Calcio or simply MapelloBonate is an Italian association football club, based in Mapello and also representing Bonate Sopra, Lombardy. MapelloBonate currently plays in Serie D.

History 
The club was founded in 2011 after the merger of the club newly promoted to Serie D of Mapello and that of Bonate Sopra in Prima Categoria.

Colors and badge 
The team's color are white and yellow.

References

External links
Official Site

Football clubs in Lombardy
Association football clubs established in 2011
2011 establishments in Italy